Peter V. Sampo (1931 – 27 May 2020) was an educator and college president. He was a founder of four colleges and was first president of two Catholic liberal arts colleges with curricula built on Great Books of Western culture, Magdalen College (now Magdalen College of the Liberal Arts)
and Thomas More College of Liberal Arts, both in New Hampshire. He served as president emeritus of Magdalen College until his death on 27 May 2020.

Life and career
Peter V. Sampo made his undergraduate studies at Saint Vincent College and earned the Ph.D.  in political science at Notre Dame.

In 1974, Sampo, together with former high-school teacher John Meehan and businessman Francis Boucher, founded Magdalen College in Bedford, New Hampshire (now Magdalen College of the Liberal Arts in Warner, New Hampshire).

Sampo was president of Magdalen until 1977, when he left to start Cardinal Newman College in Missouri.  After Cardinal Newman College closed for financial reasons in 1985, he began work on Thomas More College of Liberal Arts in Merrimack, New Hampshire, offering a four-year liberal arts curriculum inspired by educators Donald and Louise Cowan.  He served as president of Thomas More until 2006.

In 2009 he founded the Erasmus Institute of Liberal Arts, a liberal arts school in Canterbury, New Hampshire offering the Cowan curriculum formerly used at Thomas More College.  In 2011, its students joined The College of Saint Mary Magdalen in Warner, New Hampshire along with Sampo and other faculty when the college agreed to offer the Cowan curriculum.

He died on 27 May 2020, after receiving last rites from the Magdalen College chaplain, Fr. Roger Boucher.

Honors
In 2007 the New England Board of Higher Education gave Sampo its "Higher Education Excellence" award.

The CiRCE Institute for classical education designated Sampo the 2008 winner of its Paideia Prize, named in honor of historian Russell Kirk.

References

External links 
Magdalen College of the Liberal Arts faculty page

Heads of universities and colleges in the United States
Thomas More College of Liberal Arts
Saint Vincent College alumni
University of Notre Dame alumni
2020 deaths
Magdalen College of the Liberal Arts
1931 births